Lists of tallest buildings in New York include:

List of tallest buildings in New York City 
List of tallest buildings in Brooklyn
List of tallest buildings in Queens
List of tallest buildings in Upstate New York 
 List of tallest buildings in Albany, New York
 List of tallest buildings in Buffalo
 List of tallest buildings in Rochester, New York
 List of tallest buildings in Syracuse, New York
List of tallest buildings on Long Island

See also
List of tallest buildings in the United States

New York